The Second Army of the Turkish Army has headquarters in Malatya. It protects Anatolia and it patrols the border with Syria, Iraq and Iran. Modern Turkish corps are referred to in TGS literature in Ottoman Turkish (1st) numerals. It is not clear when the change occurred.
An arbitrary date of 1945 has been chosen as the point at which to start referring to corps in Ottoman Turkish numerals.

History  

The former headquarters of the 2nd Army, which was transferred from Konya to Malatya in 1983, was in Konya.

Formations

Order of battle, August 30, 1922 
On August 30, 1922, the Second Army was organized as follows:

Second Army HG (Commander: Yakup Şevki Subaşı, Chief of Staff: Hüseyin Hüsnü Emir Erkilet)
III Corps (Şükrü Naili Gökberk)
61st Infantry Division (Salih Omurtak)
41st Infantry Division (Alâaddin Koval)
1st Infantry Division (Abdurrahman Nafiz Gürman)
VI Corps (Kâzım İnanç)
17th Infantry Division (Nurettin Özsü)
16th Infantry Division (Aşir Atlı)

Order of Battle, 1941 

In June 1941, the Second Army was organized as follows:

Second Army HQ (Balıkesir, Commander: Abdurrahman Nafiz Gürman)
Dardanelles and Marmara
II Corps (Gelibolu)
Demirkapı Fortified Area Command
I Corps (Çanakkale)
Dardanelles Fortified Area Command
V Corps (Bursa)
Aegean and Mediterranean coasts
XII Corps (İzmir)
İzmir Fortified Area Command

The 1970s and operation of Cyprus
From August 1970-August 1972 Semih Sancar commanded 2nd Army Command.

The ground forces detailed for the operation were put under the command of the 6th Corps/Second Army. They included the "Cakmak Special Strike Force", a brigade level unit which would conduct the amphibious landing, the Commando brigade, the Parachute brigade, the 39th infantry division, the 28th motorised infantry division and elements of the 5th armoured brigade and the Jandarma. About 6,000 Turkish-Cypriot fighters were stationed inside the Gönyeli enclave.

Order of Battle, 2010 
Şükrü Sarıışık commanded 2004-06. From 30 August 2006 - 30 August 2008 General Hasan Iğsız commanded 2nd Army. General Necdet Özel commanded the army in 2008-2010. 

Estimated order of battle includes:
6th Corps (Adana)
5th Armored Brigade (Gaziantep) - units despatched to Turkish border August 17, 2012, during Syrian uprising.
39th Mechanized Infantry Brigade (İskenderun)
106th Artillery Regiment (İslahiye)
7th Corps (Diyarbakır)
3rd Tactical Infantry Division (3 üncü Piyade Tümen Komutanlığı) (Yüksekova)
16th Mechanized Brigade (Diyarbakır)
20th Mechanized Brigade (Şanlıurfa) - units despatched to Turkish border August 17, 2012, during Syrian uprising.
70th Mechanized Infantry Brigade (Mardin)
172nd Armored Brigade (Silopi)
2nd Motorized Infantry Brigade (Lice)
6th Motorized Infantry Brigade (Akçay)
3rd Commando Brigade (Siirt)
107th Artillery Regiment (Siverek)

Reported order of battle, 2012, during Syrian uprising

The 2nd Army Command, headquartered in Malatya, has the second-highest number of troops after the Istanbul-based 1st Army Command, comprising roughly 100,000 soldiers. It is under the control of the Commander of the Land Forces, and includes these affiliated units:
4th Corps (Ankara)
6th Corps (Adana)
7th Corps (Diyarbakır)
3rd Tactical Infantry Division (Yüksekova)
28th Mechanized Infantry Brigade (Mamak)
58th Artillery Brigade (Polatlı)
1st Commando Brigade (Talas)
2nd Commando Brigade (Bolu)
5th Armored Brigade (Gaziantep)
39th Mechanized Infantry Brigade (İskenderun)
106th Artillery Regiment (İslahiye)
34th Border Brigade (Şemdinli)
16th Mechanized Brigade (Diyarbakır)
20th Armored Brigade (Şanlıurfa)
70th Mechanized Infantry Brigade (Mardin)
172nd Armored Brigade (Silopi)
2nd Motorized Infantry Brigade (Lice)
6th Motorized Infantry Brigade (Akçay)
3rd Commando Brigade (Siirt)
107th Artillery Regiment (Siverek)

See also
List of Commanders of the Second Army of Turkey

Notes

External links
http://www.noev-kovcheg.ru/mag/2007-06/719.html  - Russian page with details on 7th Corps of Second Army
https://www.iswresearch.org/2020/03/turkeys-military-buildup-in-syrias.html - Turkish deployments in Syria, 2020

Turkish 02 Army
Military units and formations of Turkey in the Turkish War of Independence
Malatya
Military units and formations established in 1923
Military units and formations established in 1921
Military units and formations disestablished in 1923
1923 establishments in Turkey